Events from the year 1593 in art.

Events
 (unknown)

Paintings

Caravaggio – Boy with a Basket of Fruit
Santi di Tito – Vision of St Thomas Aquinas
Cornelis van Haarlem – The Wedding of Peleus and Thetis
Hans von Aachen – Pallas Athena, Venus and Juno
Rowland Lockey- Sir Thomas More and Family
Streatham portrait

Births
March 13 - Georges de La Tour, painter from the Duchy of Lorraine, now in France (died 1652)
May 19 - Jacob Jordaens, Flemish Baroque painter from the Antwerp school of painting (died 1678)
July 8 - Artemisia Gentileschi, Italian Baroque painter (d. c.1654)
September 22 - Matthäus Merian, Swiss engraver (died 1650)
October - Cornelis Janssens van Ceulen, Dutch portrait painter (died 1661)
December 23 - Ercole Sarti, Italian deaf painter, active in Ferrara (d. unknown)
date unknown
Giovanni Battista Barbiani, Italian painter (died 1650)
Willem van Haecht, Flemish painter (died 1637)
Balthasar van der Ast, Dutch Golden Age painter who specialized in still lifes of flowers and fruit (died 1657)
Jan van de Velde, Dutch School painter and engraver of animal, landscape and still-life subjects (died 1641)
probable
Louis Le Nain, French painter of the Le Nain family of painters (died 1648)
Ni Yuanlu, Chinese calligrapher and painter during the Ming Dynasty (died 1644)
Balthasar van der Ast, Dutch painter who specialized in still lifes of flowers and fruit (died 1657)
1593/1601: Pieter Soutman, Dutch Golden Age painter (died 1657)

Deaths
July 11 - Giuseppe Arcimboldo, Italian painter best known for creating portrait heads made entirely of such objects as fruits, vegetables, and flowers (born 1527)
November 20 - Hans Bol, Flemish painter (born 1534)
November 30 - Niccolò Granello, Italian fresco painter established in Spain (born 1553)
date unknown
Claudio de Arciniega, Spanish sculptor and architect (born 1520)
Giovanni Paolo Lolmo, Italian painter (born 1550)
Zhang Han, Chinese scholar-official, literary author, painter, and essayist (born 1511)
Xu Wei, Ming Dynasty Chinese painter, poet and dramatist (born 1521)
probable - Jean Cousin the Elder, French painter, sculptor, etcher, engraver, and geometrician (born 1500)

 
Years of the 16th century in art